Grihanathan is a 2012 Malayalam family film directed by Mohan Kupleri, starring Mukesh and Sonia Agarwal in the lead roles.

Cast
 Mukesh as Vishvanathan/ GV
 Sonia Agarwal as Anitha
 Siddique as Alex
 Sudheesh as Sundara
 Jagathy Sreekumar as Reghuettan
 Suraj Venjaramoodu as Thampan
 Subi Suresh as Shanta
 Lakshmi Priya
 Jayakrishnan as Doctor
 Ponnamma Babu
 Urmila Unni
 Naseer Puthiyandy as Hotel Manager
 Ambika Mohan as doctor

References

2010s Malayalam-language films
Indian family films
Films directed by Mohan Kupleri